Anton Björkman (born May 13, 1999) is a Swedish professional ice hockey defenseman. He is currently playing with Linköpings HC of the Swedish Hockey League (SHL).

Playing career
Born in Linköping, Sweden, Björkman played junior hockey, with local team Linköpings HC. In 2013–14, he debuted at the under-16 level, in the J16 SM. He also competed with a regional all-star team from Östergötland in the annual TV-pucken, an under-15 national tournament. The following season he dressed for 9 U-18 games recording 2 points. After impressive seasons in the J20 SuperElit; Björkman logged his first minutes in the Swedish Hockey League, against the Malmö Redhawks.

Career statistics

Regular season and playoffs

International

References

External links

1999 births
Living people
Linköping HC players
IK Oskarshamn players
Swedish ice hockey defencemen
Sportspeople from Linköping